Tabea Heynig (born 18 July 1970) is a German actress.

Career
After graduating from high school, Heynig worked as a model in Milan for a few years, then completed an apprenticeship as an actress from 1993 to 1996 at the Zerboni drama school in Munich.

From 29 August 2006, she took part in the ARD soap opera Verbotene Liebe, where she played the role of the French teacher Anne Siebert, in which she could be seen until 27 April 2007. Since 22 January 2010 she can be seen in the lead role Britta Schönfeld in Unter uns. At the beginning of 2015, she was with Alexander Sholti, Petra Blossey and Benjamin Heinrich at The Perfect Celebrity Dinner Among Us Special.

Personal life
Heynig has been married since January 2018 and had their first son in February 2018 at the age of 47.

Filmography 
 1993: Derrick (TV Series)
 1995: Schwurgericht (TV Series)
 1996: Wildbach (TV Series)
 1997: Die Sexfalle (TV)
 1997: Polizeiruf 110: Im Netz der Spinne (TV)
 1997: Zwei Brüder – Tödliche Träume (TV)
 1998: Der gerade Weg (TV)
 1998: Aus heiterem Himmel (TV Series)
 1998: Samt und Seide (TV Series)
 1999: Der Student
 1999: Wechselspiele
 1999: Flush & Brush
 1999: Operation Bluebird
 2000: Forsthaus Falkenau (TV Series, one episode)
 2001: 666 – Traue keinem, mit dem du schläfst!
 2002: 
 2004: Vinzent
 2006–2007: Verbotene Liebe (TV Series)
 2006: Zwei Engel für Amor
 2007: Madness Is Catching
 2008: Wilsberg: Filmriss
 since 2010: Unter uns (TV Series)

References

External links 
 

1970 births
Living people
Actors from Mannheim
German film actresses
German television actresses